I Wayan Gangga Mudana (born April 24, 1981) is an Indonesian footballer who played for Pusamania Borneo F.C. before retiring as a professional football player.

References

External links
 

1981 births
Association football midfielders
Living people
Balinese people
Balinese sportspeople
Indonesian footballers
Liga 1 (Indonesia) players
Persegi Gianyar players
Gresik United players
Persela Lamongan players
Persija Jakarta players
Persisam Putra Samarinda players
Indonesian Premier Division players
Persmin Minahasa players
Persiba Balikpapan players
Borneo F.C. players
Sportspeople from Bali